Alexander Julius Reichert (25 January 1859 – 1 July 1939) was a German entomologist specialising in Lepidoptera. His collection is in Naturkundemuseum Leipzig and the Zoological Institute in the University of Leipzig.

German entomologists
1859 births
1939 deaths